Tlyaumbetovo (Teläwembät) is a rural locality (a village) in Tlyaumbetovsky Selsoviet, Kugarchinsky District, Bashkortostan, Russia. The population was 384 as of 2010. There are 5 streets.

Geography 
Tlyaumbetovo is located 38 km west of Mrakovo (the district's administrative centre) by road. Chernigovsky is the nearest rural locality.

References 

Rural localities in Kugarchinsky District